The 2014 ICC Women's World Twenty20 was the fourth ICC Women's World Twenty20 competition, taking place in Bangladesh from 23 March to 6 April 2014. The tournament was played in the cities of Sylhet and Dhaka – Cox's Bazar was originally intended to also host matches, but the venue was not available due to ongoing development. The tournament featured 10 teams, rather than the eight at previous tournaments, with all matches in the tournament accorded women's Twenty20 International (T20I) status. Bangladesh and Ireland made their first appearances at the event, which was run concurrently with the men's tournament. Australia won the tournament, beating England in the final by six wickets.

Logo
On 6 April 2013 ICC unveiled the logo of the tournament at a gala event in Dhaka. The logo uses the colours of the Bangladesh flag with splashes of blue representing the country's iconic waterways (also as being the ICC's own colour). The logo is also inspired by the unique painted rickshaws which pack the streets of the Bangladesh cities. The T is made up of cricket stumps and the "0" in the T20 represents the cricket ball complete with Bangladeshi green seam while the white in the design lends an energetic, friendly and youthful feel to the logo.

Teams
For the first time the tournament had 10 teams. The top six teams from the 2012 ICC World Twenty20 and hosts Bangladesh automatically qualified for the tournament. Three additional teams qualified for the tournament through the 2013 ICC Women's World Twenty20 Qualifier.

Top 6 from 2012 ICC Women's World Twenty20

Top 3 from 2013 ICC Women's World Twenty20 Qualifier

Hosts

Squads

Venues

The 2014 ICC Women's World Twenty20 hosted a total of 25 matches. The BKSP Grounds in Savar hosted practice matches. The group stage matches were held at the Sylhet Divisional Stadium, Sylhet, while the semi-finals and the final were held at the Sher-e-Bangla National Cricket Stadium, Mirpur, Dhaka.

Warm-up matches 
A total of 10 warm-up matches were played between 18 and 21 March, featuring all 10 teams at the Bangladesh Krira Shikkha Protisthan Grounds in Savar. Pakistan and India also played a number of Twenty20 International matches against Bangladesh prior to the official warm-up matches.

Group stage 
Each team played every other team in its group with all group stage matches being played at the Sylhet Divisional Stadium in Sylhet. The top four teams from each group qualified for the knockout phase and the 2016 ICC Women's World Twenty20. The third and fourth placed teams from each group participated in a play-off for automatic qualification for the 2016 ICC Women's World Twenty20.

Group A 

 Advanced to Knockout stage.
 Advanced to Qualification play-offs for 2016 ICC Women's World Twenty20.
 Advanced to 9th-place play-off.

Group B 

 Advanced to Knockout stage.
 Advanced to Qualification play-offs for 2016 ICC Women's World Twenty20.
 Advanced to 9th-place play-off.

Qualification play-offs

Classification play-offs

7th-place play-off

9th-place play-off

Knockout stage

Semi-finals

Final 
The final was the 15th time that Australia and England had played each other across the three formats (Twenty20, One Day Internationals and Tests) in 8 months. England had won both of the recent Ashes series, and Australia defeated England in the 2012 Twenty20 World Twenty20 final (by four runs) and again at the 2013 World Cup (by two runs). During this tournament both teams had finished top of their respective pools due to their higher net run rate after they both recorded three wins and one loss.

Australia won the final after England, batting first, scored 105 runs for the loss of eight wickets in their twenty overs. Australia reached England's score during their innings in just 15.1 overs. Australia's captain Meg Lanning, top scored in the match with 44 runs from 30 balls while the best bowler was Sarah Coyte who took 3 wickets for 16 runs from her four overs, and earning the Player of the Match award in the process. England's Anya Shrubsole was named Player of the Tournament for her bowling across the tournament. It was Australia's third World Twenty20 victory in a row.

Statistics

Most runs

Source: ESPNCricinfo

Most wickets

Source: ESPNCricinfo

See also
 2014 ICC World Twenty20

References

 
International cricket competitions in 2014
International women's cricket competitions in Bangladesh
ICC Women's World Twenty20
ICC Women's World Twenty20
ICC Women's World Twenty20
World Twenty20